The Mayor of Tirana is the head of the General Assembly in Tirana, Albania. The mayor including with his cabinet, exercises the executive power of the city and is directly elected together with the City Council, directly for 4-year term.

The city council is made up of 61 members. It exercises the legislative power of Tirana. The City Hall of Tirana is the seat of the council and located at the Skanderbeg Square.

The current officeholder is Erion Veliaj of the Socialist Party who was elected for his first four-year-term on 21 July 2015.

History

1913–1990 
After the General Assembly of Tirana in 1913, Zyber Hallulli elected as the first mayor of Tirana. He served from 1913 to 1914 as the mayor. Ali Bakiu became the 19th mayor of Tirana. He served after the World War II, from 1945 to 1947. In 1986, Llambi Gegprifti became the mayor of the city, selected twice. First from 1986 to 1987 and 1989 to 1990 (after the fall of communism in Albania).

Mayors of Tirana (1990–present)

See also 
 Politics of Albania

References